Echinophora is a genus of plants belonging to the parsley family, Apiaceae. The thistle-like spininess of the plants is reflected in the genus name, composed of the Greek prefix  echino- meaning "spiny" (from ἐχῖνος echīnos "hedgehog") and the suffix -phora meaning "carrier", giving the meaning "spine-bearer".

Species
The genus comprises 11 accepted species

References

 
Apioideae genera